Tetyra is a genus of shield-backed bugs in the family Scutelleridae. There are about seven described species in Tetyra.

Species
These seven species belong to the genus Tetyra:
 Tetyra antillarum Kirkaldy, 1909
 Tetyra bipunctata (Herrich-schaeffer, 1839) (shieldbacked pine seed bug)
 Tetyra marginata
 Tetyra ocellata
 Tetyra pinguis Germar, 1839
 Tetyra robusta Uhler, 1897
 † Tetyra hassii Heer, 1853

References

Further reading

External links

 

Scutelleridae
Articles created by Qbugbot
Pentatomomorpha genera